Return to Treasure Island is a 1954 American adventure film directed by Ewald André Dupont and starring Tab Hunter, Dawn Addams and Porter Hall. Shot in Pathécolor it was distributed by United Artists. The film is about modern-day adventurers (circa 1950s) exploring the desert island from Robert Louis Stevenson's frequently filmed 1883 novel Treasure Island. Though Stevenson's story was fictional, it is treated as historical for the purposes of the film's plot.

Cast
Tab Hunter as Clive Stone
Dawn Addams as Jamesina "Jamie" Hawkins
Porter Hall as Maximillian "Maxie" Harris
James Seay as Felix Newman
Harry Lauter as Parker
William Cottrell as Cookie
Lane Chandler as Capt. Cardigan
Henry Rowland as Williams
Dayton Lummis as Capt. Flint
Robert Long as Long John Silver
Ken Terrell as Thompson

See also
Long John Silver, a 1954 American-Australian film directed by Byron Haskin starring Robert Newton as Long John Silver

References

External links

1954 adventure films
Films directed by E. A. Dupont
Treasure Island films
Films scored by Paul Sawtell
Films produced by Aubrey Wisberg
Films with screenplays by Aubrey Wisberg
American adventure films
1950s English-language films
1950s American films